The 1967 European Wrestling Championships were held in the Greco-Romane style and  in Minsk 19 - 22 May 1967; the men's Freestyle style  in Istanbul 07 – 10 July 1967.

Medal table

Medal summary

Men's freestyle

Men's Greco-Roman

References

External links
Fila's official championship website

Europe
W
W
European Wrestling Championships
Euro
Euro
Sports competitions in Istanbul
Sports competitions in Minsk
1967 in European sport